Ruth Rehmann (June 1, 1922 – January 29, 2016) was a German writer.

Life
Rehmann was born in Siegburg, the daughter of a local pastor. She studied in Hamburg with the aim of becoming a translator; and then she studied art history, German literature and music. During the 1950s, she worked as a violinist, as a teacher and as a press secretary at the American and Indian embassies. In 1983, Rehmann ran as a Green Party candidate for a seat in the Bundestag.

In 1959, Rehmann published her first novel Illusions (Illusionen). She had attracted much attention when she read a chapter from that book at the Group 47 conference in 1958. Her second novel The People in the Valley (Die Leute im Tal) won first prize in a literature contest. Later novels include:
 The Man in the Pulpit (Der Mann auf der Kanzel) (1979)
 Farewell from the master class (Abschied von der Meisterklasse) (1985)
 The Woman from Schwaig Farm (Die Schwaigerin) (1987)
She has also written several radio plays and some short stories.

References 

1922 births
2016 deaths
20th-century German novelists
German women novelists
20th-century German women writers
Recipients of the Cross of the Order of Merit of the Federal Republic of Germany